Caroline Arft (born 14 January 1996) is a German canoeist. She competed in the women's K-2 500 metres event at the 2020 Summer Olympics.

References

External links
 

1996 births
Living people
German female canoeists
Canoeists at the 2020 Summer Olympics
Olympic canoeists of Germany
European Games competitors for Germany
Canoeists at the 2019 European Games
ICF Canoe Sprint World Championships medalists in kayak
21st-century German women